Luke Cunningham Wilson (born September 21, 1971) is an American actor known for his roles in films such as Bottle Rocket (1996), Rushmore (1998), My Dog Skip (2000), Legally Blonde (2001), The Royal Tenenbaums (2001), Idiocracy (2006), You Kill Me (2007), The Skeleton Twins (2014), Meadowland (2015) and Brad's Status (2017). On television, he played Casey Kelso on That '70s Show (2002–05), Levi Callow on Enlightened (2011–13) and Pat Dugan / S.T.R.I.P.E. on Stargirl (2020–22). He is the brother of actors Andrew Wilson and Owen Wilson.

Early life
Wilson was born in Dallas the youngest of three sons of Robert Andrew Wilson (1941–2017), an advertising and television executive, and his wife Laura (née Cunningham; born 1939), a photographer. His family, originally from Massachusetts, is of Irish Catholic descent. 

All three Wilson boys attended St. Mark's School of Texas. According to Owen, Luke was voted class president the first year he attended St. Mark's. He became interested in acting while attending Occidental College in Los Angeles.

Career

Wilson's acting career began with the lead role in the short film Bottle Rocket in 1994 which was co-written by his older brother Owen and director Wes Anderson. It was remade as a feature-length film in 1996. After moving to Hollywood with his two brothers, he was cast opposite Calista Flockhart in Telling Lies in America and made a cameo appearance in the film-within-the-film of Scream 2, both in 1997. Wilson filmed back-to-back romantic films in 1998, opposite Drew Barrymore, Best Men, about a group of friends who pull off a heist on their way to a wedding, and Home Fries which is about two brothers interested in the same woman for different reasons. He played the physician beau of a schoolteacher in Rushmore (also released in 1998) also directed by Anderson and co-written by his brother Owen.

In 1999, he portrayed Detective Carlson in Blue Streak. He later starred opposite Reese Witherspoon in the 2001 comedy Legally Blonde. It was followed by Old School and The Royal Tenenbaums. Wilson also had a role on That '70s Show, as Michael Kelso's older brother Casey Kelso appearing sporadically from 2002 through 2005.

In 2006, Wilson starred in Idiocracy, a dystopian comedy directed by Mike Judge. Wilson portrayed an ordinary serviceman frozen in a cryogenics project. He awakens after hundreds of years in an America which is significantly less intelligent.

In 2007, Wilson starred in the thriller Vacancy, opposite Kate Beckinsale, and Blonde Ambition. In the same year, he worked on Henry Poole is Here in La Mirada, California which was released in 2008. In 2009, he starred in Tenure. In 2010, he appeared in films Death at a Funeral and Middle Men. From 2011 to 2013 he starred in the HBO TV series Enlightened.

Since 2020, Wilson stars in the DC Universe/The CW series Stargirl as sidekick-turned-mechanic-turned superhero Pat Dugan / S.T.R.I.P.E. .

Wilson has written a Wright Brothers biopic with his brother Owen, in which they also plan to star.

Personal life
Wilson was formerly in a relationship with Home Fries co-star Drew Barrymore.

In a 2019 interview, Wilson commented on the fact that he has publicly expressed interest in starting a family since 1996, stating, "I’m 47, I’m ready for that. I need to get to work."

Filmography

Film

Television

See also

Notable alumni of St. Mark's School of Texas

References

External links

 

1971 births
Living people
20th-century American male actors
21st-century American male actors
American male film actors
American male television actors
American male voice actors
American people of Irish descent
St. Mark's School (Texas) alumni
Male actors from Dallas
Texas Christian University alumni
Occidental College alumni
Frat Pack